The Muslims in Slovenia are ethnically mostly Bosniaks and ethnic Muslims. In 2014, there were 48,266 Muslims in Slovenia, making up about 2.4 percent of the total population. There are also a few Muslim migrant workers from Central Asia; however, they are not counted in the census, because they are not citizens of Slovenia.

Demographics
Demographics of Muslims In Slovenia by ethnicity in 2002

Muslim buildings in Slovenia

There was a mosque in Log pod Mangartom, a village now in the extreme northwest of Slovenia, Log pod Mangartom Mosque, built by the Bosnian-Herzegovinian Infantry Regiment No. 4 during World War I and probably demolished soon after the war. In 2013, works begun to build a mosque in Ljubljana, to be completed in 2016.

Ljubljana Mosque
In September 2013 the foundation stone was laid for a mosque to be 70% funded by Qatar 44 years after the a petition was filed to build a mosque. The mosque will include a cultural centre at a cost of US$16 million to be completed in 2016 with construction commencing in November. The groundbreaking was attended by Prime Minister Alenka Bratušek who said the building would be a "symbolic victory against all forms of religious intolerance" and that Europe would not be as culturally rich without Islam. There were about 10,000 others in attendance including Ljubljana Mayor Zoran Jankovic and an unnamed government minister from Qatar. Slovenia's highest Islamic authority Mufti Nedzad Grabus said: "We are happy to be starting this civic project in Ljubljana, which will thus become a better-known and a more pluralistic city." The ceremony was also attended by the Bosniak member of the Presidency of Bosnia and Herzegovina Bakir Izetbegović. Other attendees were former President of Slovenia Danilo Turk and Mufti of the Islamic Community in Bosnia and Herzegovina Hussein Kavazovic. The project had faced administrative hurdles and was a political risk in a majority Roman Catholic country. It also faced a possible referendum on the matter in 2004 with 12,000 signatures for it; however, the Constitutional Court of Slovenia rejected the petition on the grounds of freedom of religion. It was also controversial due to the financial crisis afflicting the country. At the ceremony, there was also a rare sight of women in headscarves.Reuters

See also
 Demographics of Slovenia
 Slovenes
 Muslims (ethnicity)

References

 
Slovenia